Roy-Allan Saul Burch (born 29 November 1985) is an Olympic and national-record holding swimmer from Bermuda. He swam for Bermuda at the 2008 Olympics and 2012 Olympics.

At the 2011 World Championships, he swam to new Bermuda Records in the 50 and 100 frees (22.69 and 51.01).

In March 2011, in preparation for the 2012 Olympics, Burch moved to Charlotte, North Carolina in the USA to train under coach David Marsh.

An accident ended his competitive career.  His attention is now on family and community.

He has swum for Bermuda at:
Olympics: 2008, 2012
World Championships: 2007, 2009, 2011, 2013
Commonwealth Games: 2002, 2010, 2014
Pan American Games: 2007, 2011

References

1985 births
Living people
Swimmers at the 2008 Summer Olympics
Swimmers at the 2012 Summer Olympics
Bermudian male swimmers
Olympic swimmers of Bermuda
Pan American Games competitors for Bermuda
Swimmers at the 2007 Pan American Games
Swimmers at the 2011 Pan American Games
Commonwealth Games competitors for Bermuda
Swimmers at the 2002 Commonwealth Games
Swimmers at the 2010 Commonwealth Games
Swimmers at the 2014 Commonwealth Games